Saiyuki: Journey West is a tactical role-playing video game released for the Sony PlayStation by Koei. It is based loosely on the Chinese novel Journey to the West.

Plot
The game follows the basic outline of the Journey to the West's plot, in which the main character, a Buddhist practitioner named Sanzo, travels from China to India on a religious mission and has a variety of adventures along the way.

Gameplay
Sanzo can be played as either a male or a female character at the player's choice. Every character except Sanzo can transform into a monstrous form for a limited time. Instead of transforming, Sanzo has access to summon spells that each boost the party's stats in different ways for a number of rounds and allows him/her to use an extra spell at will. Furthermore, each character has a native element that powers their spells and weakens them to opposing elements.

Reception

The game received "average" reviews according to the review aggregation website Metacritic. Eric Bratcher of NextGen said that the game "won't dazzle your eyes, but with compelling characters, a unique setting and plot, and nice tactical depth, it's still a grand experience." In Japan, Famitsu gave it a score of 31 out of 40.

The game was nominated for "Best Game No One Played" at GameSpots Best and Worst of 2001 Awards, which went to Victorious Boxers: Ippo's Road to Glory.

Notes

References

External links

1999 video games
Koei games
PlayStation (console) games
PlayStation Network games
Shenmo fiction
Tactical role-playing video games
Video games developed in Japan
Video games featuring female protagonists
Works based on Journey to the West
Video games based on Chinese mythology
Video games set in India